Lady at Midnight is a 1948 American mystery film directed by Sam Newfield and starring Richard Denning, Frances Rafferty, and Claudia Drake.

The film's sets were designed by the art director Edward C. Jewell. It was shot at the Universal Studios.

Plot

Cast
 Richard Denning as Peter Wiggins 
 Frances Rafferty as Ellen McPhail Wiggins 
 Lora Lee Michel as Tina Wiggins 
 Ralph Dunn as Al Garrity 
 Nana Bryant as Lydia Forsythe 
 Jackie Searl as Freddy Forsythe 
 Harlan Warde as Ross Atherton 
 Claudia Drake as Carolyn 'Sugar' Gold 
 Ben Welden as Willie Gold
 Rodney Bell as Joe Kelly - Pete's Co-Worker 
 Ben Erway as Dr. Adams
 William Gould as Police Chief Mulhare 
 Sid Melton as Benny Muscle 
 Lee Roberts as Police Detective
 Pierre Watkin as John Featherstone

References

Bibliography
 Langman, Larry. A Guide to American Film Directors: the Sound Era, 1929-1979, Volume 2. Scarecrow Press, 1981

External links
 

1948 films
1948 mystery films
1940s English-language films
American mystery films
Films directed by Sam Newfield
Eagle-Lion Films films
American black-and-white films
1940s American films